Events from the year 1887 in Russia.

Incumbents
 Monarch – Alexander III

Events

  Reinsurance Treaty
 
 
 Ashgabat (park)
 Saint Gregory the Illuminator's Church, Baku
 Defence Forces Cemetery of Tallinn

Births

Deaths

References

1887 in Russia
Years of the 19th century in the Russian Empire